West LaHave is a community in the Canadian province of Nova Scotia, located in the Lunenburg Municipal District in Lunenburg County on the shore of the LaHave River.  The community is the home of St. Peter's Anglican Church.

Communities in Lunenburg County, Nova Scotia
General Service Areas in Nova Scotia